Muscovite is a mineral.

Muscovite may also refer to:

 An inhabitant of the city of Moscow
 An old foreign name for Russians who inhabited the Grand Duchy of Moscow or Muscovite Russia

See also
 
Moskvitch (disambiguation)
Moscovium, a chemical element